Acer sterculiaceum, commonly known as Franchet’s maple or Himalayan maple, is a species of maple tree in the soapberry family. It is indigenous to Bhutan, northern India, and southwestern and central China (Guizhou, Henan, Hubei, Hunan, Shaanxi, Sichuan, Tibet, Yunnan).

It is a tree up to 20 meters tall with dark gray or grayish-brown bark. Leaves are palmately lobed, usually with 3 or 5 lobes but occasionally 7. Leaves are up to 20 cm long, thick and a bit leathery, dark green and hairless on the top, lighter green and woolly on the underside.

 Subspecies
 Acer sterculiaceum subsp. franchetii (Pax) A.E.Murray - central and southwestern China
 Acer sterculiaceum subsp. sterculiaceum - Yunnan, Tibet, Bhutan, India
 Acer sterculiaceum subsp. thomsonii (Miq.) A.E.Murray - northern India

References

External links
 
 Encyclopedia of Life

sterculiaceum
Plants described in 1830
Trees of Bhutan
Trees of China
Flora of Assam (region)
Flora of Tibet